Tainted Love is the sixteenth studio album released by American country music singer Jan Howard. The album was released in 1983 on AVI Records and was produced by Jimmy Capps, Ed Cobb and Ray Harris. It was among Howard's final studio albums that have been released to date. In addition, it spawned two singles including the title track.

Background and content
Tainted Love was recorded at Woodland Studios, located in East Nashville, Tennessee. The album was produced by Jimmy Capps, who was also credited with playing electric guitar on its sessions. Capps co-produced the record with Ed Cobb and Ray Harris. Cobb was the original writer and producer of the title track, originally recorded in the 1960s by Gloria Jones. Tainted Love consisted of nine tracks. The album's tenth track, "Silver Tongue and Gold Plated Lies", was later recorded and released as a single by K.T. Oslin in 1996. The song appeared on Oslin's 1996 album My Roots Are Showing.... Additionally, Howard's version of the song featured Bobby Osborne and Sonny Osborne, members of the bluegrass group The Osborne Brothers.

The second track, "Give My Old Memory a Call", was co-written by country artist Ed Bruce. "My Friend" (the album's fourth track) was co-written by Howard herself. The song was Howard's last self-penned song to appear on one of her studio releases.

Release
Tainted Love was officially released in 1983 on AVI Records. The album was issued in a vinyl record format, with five songs on the first side and five songs on the second side of the album. The album spawned two singles. The title track was the first to be issued, in 1983. Its second single was "Silver Tongue and Gold Plated Lies", in 1984. Both singles did not chart on any Billboard surveys. The album also did not reach any peak positions on the same chart following its release.

Track listing

Personnel
All credits are adapted from the liner notes of Tainted Love.

Musical personnel
 Norah Lee Allen – background vocals
 Joe Edwards – fiddle
 Jimmy Capps – electric guitar
 Ralph Davis – rhythm guitar
 Carol Lee Davis – background vocals
 Herman Harper – background vocals
 Jan Howard – lead vocals, background vocals
 Carol Lee Singers – background vocals
 Billy Linneman – acoustic guitar, electric guitar
 Dennis McCall – background vocals
 Weldon Myrick –steel guitar
 Bobby Osborne – background vocals (track 9)
 Sonny Osborne – background vocals (track 9)
 Leon Rhodes – electric bass
 Jerry Whitehurst – piano
 Jimmie Wilson – electric guitar

Technical personnel
 Andy Benefield – engineering
 Jimmy Capps – producer
 Ed Cobb – executive producer
 Ron Corlew – engineering
 Bob Harman – cover (portrait)
 Ray Harris – executive producer 
 Bev Lacy – design cover

Release history

References

1983 albums
Jan Howard albums
Albums produced by Ed Cobb